Avatar (marketed as James Cameron's Avatar) is a 2009 epic science fiction film directed, written, co-produced, and co-edited by James Cameron and starring Sam Worthington, Zoe Saldana, Stephen Lang, Michelle Rodriguez, and Sigourney Weaver. It is set in the mid-22nd century, when humans are colonizing Pandora, a lush habitable moon of a gas giant in the Alpha Centauri star system, in order to mine the valuable mineral unobtanium. The expansion of the mining colony threatens the continued existence of a local tribe of Na'vi, a humanoid species indigenous to Pandora. The title of the film refers to a genetically engineered Na'vi body operated from the brain of a remotely located human that is used to interact with the natives of Pandora.

Development of Avatar began in 1994, when James Cameron wrote an 80-page treatment for the film. Filming was supposed to take place after the completion of Cameron's 1997 film Titanic, for a planned release in 1999; however, according to Cameron, the necessary technology was not yet available to achieve his vision of the film. Work on the language of the Na'vi began in 2005, and Cameron began developing the screenplay and fictional universe in early 2006. Avatar was officially budgeted at $237 million, due to the groundbreaking array of new visual effects Cameron achieved in cooperation with Weta Digital in Wellington. Other estimates put the cost at between $280 million and $310 million for production and at $150 million for promotion. The film made extensive use of new motion capture filming techniques and was released for traditional viewing, 3D viewing (using the RealD 3D, Dolby 3D, XpanD 3D, and IMAX 3D formats), and "4D" experiences in selected South Korean theaters.

Avatar premiered on December 10, 2009, in London and was released in the United States on December 18, 2009, to positive reviews. Critics highly praised its groundbreaking visual effects, though the story was considered to be predictable. During its theatrical run, the film broke several box office records, including becoming the highest-grossing film of all time since January 2010. In July 2019, this position was overtaken by Avengers: Endgame, but with subsequent re-releases, beginning with China in March 2021, it returned to becoming the highest-grossing film since then. Adjusted for inflation, Avatar is the second-highest-grossing movie of all time, only behind Gone with the Wind, with a total of a little more than $3.5 billion. Avatar was nominated for nine Academy Awards, including Best Picture and Best Director, and won three for Best Art Direction, Best Cinematography, and Best Visual Effects. The success of the film also led to electronics manufacturers releasing 3D televisions and caused 3D films to increase in popularity.

Following the film's success, Cameron signed with 20th Century Fox to produce four sequels. The first sequel, Avatar: The Way of Water, was released on December 16, 2022, which received similar reviews and broke various box office records, including becoming the highest-grossing film of that year and the third-highest-grossing film of all time. Avatar 3 has completed principal filming and will be released in 2024. Further sequels are scheduled for release in 2026 and in 2028. Several cast members returned, including Worthington, Saldana, Lang, and Weaver.

Plot 

In 2154, the natural resources of the Earth have been depleted. The Resources Development Administration (RDA) mines the valuable mineral unobtanium on Pandora, a moon in the Alpha Centauri star system. Pandora, whose atmosphere is inhospitable to humans, is inhabited by the Na'vi, blue-skinned, sapient humanoids that live in harmony with nature. To explore Pandora, genetically matched human scientists use Na'vi-human hybrids called "avatars." Paraplegic Marine Jake Sully is sent to Pandora to replace his deceased identical twin, who had signed up to be an operator. Avatar Program head Dr. Grace Augustine considers Sully inadequate but accepts him as a bodyguard.

While escorting the avatars of Grace and Dr. Norm Spellman, Jake's avatar is attacked by Pandoran wildlife, and he flees into the forest, where he is rescued by female Na'vi Neytiri. Suspicious of Jake, she takes him to her clan. Neytiri's mother, Mo'at, the clan's spiritual leader, orders her daughter to initiate Jake into their society. Colonel Miles Quaritch, head of RDA's security force, promises Jake that the company will restore the use of his legs if he provides information about the Na'vi and their gathering place, the giant Hometree, under which is a rich deposit of unobtanium. Learning of this, Grace transfers herself, Jake, and Norm to an outpost. Jake and Neytiri fall in love as Jake is initiated into the tribe. He and Neytiri choose each other as mates. When Jake attempts to disable a bulldozer threatening a sacred Na'vi site, Administrator Parker Selfridge orders Hometree destroyed. Despite Grace's argument that destroying Hometree could damage Pandora's biological neural network, Selfridge gives Jake and Grace one hour to convince the Na'vi to evacuate.

Jake confesses that he was a spy and the Na'vi take him and Grace captive. Quaritch's soldiers destroy Hometree, killing many, including Neytiri's father, the clan chief. Mo'at frees Jake and Grace, but they are detached from their avatars and imprisoned by Quaritch's forces. Pilot Trudy Chacón, disgusted by Quaritch's brutality, airlifts Jake, Grace, and Norm to Grace's outpost. Grace is shot during the escape. Jake regains the Na'vi's trust by connecting his mind to that of Toruk, a dragon-like creature feared and revered by the Na'vi. At the sacred Tree of Souls, Jake pleads with Mo'at to heal Grace. The clan attempts to transfer Grace into her avatar with the aid of the Tree of Souls, but she dies. Supported by new chief Tsu'tey, Jake unites the clan, telling them to gather all the clans to battle the RDA. Quaritch organizes a strike against the Tree of Souls to demoralize the Na'vi. Jake prays to the Na'vi deity Eywa via a neural connection with the Tree of Souls. Tsu'tey and Trudy are among the battle's heavy casualties.

The Na'vi are rescued when Pandoran wildlife unexpectedly join the attack and overwhelm the humans, which Neytiri interprets as Eywa answering Jake's prayer. Quaritch, wearing an AMP suit, escapes his crashed aircraft and breaks open the avatar link unit containing Jake's human body, exposing it to Pandora's poisonous atmosphere. As Quaritch prepares to slit Jake's avatar's throat, he is killed by Neytiri, who saves Jake from suffocation, seeing his human form for the first time. With the exceptions of Jake, Norm, and a select few others, all humans are expelled from Pandora. Jake is permanently transferred into his avatar with the aid of the Tree of Souls.

Cast 

 Sam Worthington as Corporal Jake Sully, a disabled former Marine who becomes part of the Avatar Program after his twin brother is killed. His military background helps the Na'vi warriors relate to him. Cameron cast the Australian actor after a worldwide search for promising young actors, preferring relative unknowns to keep the budget down. Worthington, who was living in his car at the time, auditioned twice early in development, and he has signed on for possible sequels. Cameron felt that because Worthington had not done a major film, he would give the character "a quality that is really real". Cameron said he "has that quality of being a guy you'd want to have a beer with, and he ultimately becomes a leader who transforms the world". Cameron offered the role to Matt Damon, with a 10% stake in the film's profits, but Damon turned the film down because of his commitment to the Bourne film series.
 Worthington also briefly appears as Jake's deceased identical twin, Tommy.
 Zoe Saldana as Neytiri te Tskaha Mo'at'ite, the daughter of the leaders of the Omaticaya (the Na'vi clan central to the story). She is attracted to Jake because of his bravery, though frustrated with him for what she sees as his naiveté and stupidity. She serves as Jake's love interest. The character, like all the Na'vi, was created using performance capture, and its visual aspect is entirely computer generated. Saldana signed on for potential sequels.
 Stephen Lang as Colonel Miles Quaritch, the head of the mining operation's security detail. Fiercely consistent in his disregard for any life not recognized as human, he has a profound disregard for Pandora's inhabitants that is evident in both his actions and his language. Lang had unsuccessfully auditioned for a role in Cameron's Aliens (1986), but the director remembered Lang and sought him for Avatar. Michael Biehn, who had worked with Cameron in Aliens, The Terminator and Terminator 2: Judgment Day, was briefly considered for the role. He read the script and watched some of the 3-D footage with Cameron but was ultimately not cast.
 Michelle Rodriguez as Trudy Chacón, a combat pilot assigned to support the Avatar Program who is sympathetic to the Na'vi. Cameron had wanted to work with Rodriguez since seeing her in Girlfight.
 Giovanni Ribisi as Parker Selfridge, the corporate administrator for the RDA mining operation. While he is at first willing to destroy the Na'vi civilization to preserve the company's bottom line, he is reluctant to authorize the attacks on the Na'vi and taint his image, doing so only after Quaritch persuades him that it is necessary and that the attacks will be humane. When the attacks are broadcast to the base, Selfridge displays discomfort at the violence.
 Joel David Moore as Dr. Norm Spellman, a xenoanthropologist who studies plant and animal life as part of the Avatar Program. He arrives on Pandora at the same time as Jake and operates an avatar. Although he is expected to lead the diplomatic contact with the Na'vi, it turns out that Jake has the personality better suited to win the natives' respect.
 Moore also portrays Spellman's Na'vi avatar.
 CCH Pounder as Mo'at, the Omaticaya's spiritual leader, Neytiri's mother, and consort to clan leader Eytukan.
 Wes Studi as Eytukan te Tskaha Kamun'itan, the Omaticaya's clan leader, Neytiri's father, and Mo'at's mate.
 Laz Alonso as Tsu'tey te Rongola Atey'itan, the finest warrior of the Omaticaya. He is heir to the chieftainship of the tribe. At the beginning of the film's story, he is betrothed to Neytiri.
 Sigourney Weaver as Dr. Grace Augustine, an exobiologist and head of the Avatar Program. She is also Sully's mentor and an advocate of peaceful relations with the Na'vi, having set up a school to teach them English.
 Weaver also portrays Grace's Na'vi avatar.
 Dileep Rao as Dr. Max Patel, a scientist who works in the Avatar Program and comes to support Jake's rebellion against the RDA
 Matt Gerald as Corporal Lyle Wainfleet, a human mercenary who works for the RDA as Quaritch's right hand man.

Additionally, Alicia Vela-Bailey appears, uncredited, as Ikeyni, the leader of the Tayrangi clan, Saeyla, one of the young hunters who accompanies Jake during his Iknimaya and a harassed blonde woman in a bar that Jake defends. Vela-Bailey served as the stunt double for Zoe Saldana and would later portray Zdinarsk in Avatar: The Way of Water. Terry Notary, who performed stunts as well, plays the Banshees via motion capture.

Production

Origins 

In 1994, director James Cameron wrote an 80-page treatment for Avatar, drawing inspiration from "every single science fiction book" he had read in his childhood as well as from adventure novels by Edgar Rice Burroughs and H. Rider Haggard. In , Cameron announced that after completing Titanic, he would film Avatar, which would make use of synthetic, or computer-generated, actors. The project would cost $100 million and involve at least six actors in leading roles "who appear to be real but do not exist in the physical world". Visual effects house Digital Domain, with whom Cameron has a partnership, joined the project, which was supposed to begin production in mid-1997 for a 1999 release. However, Cameron felt that the technology had not caught up with the story and vision that he intended to tell. He decided to concentrate on making documentaries and refining the technology for the next few years.

In February 2006, Cameron revealed that his film Project 880 was "a retooled version of Avatar", a film that he had tried to make years earlier, citing the technological advances in the creation of the computer-generated characters Gollum, King Kong, and Davy Jones. Cameron had chosen Avatar over his project Battle Angel after completing a five-day camera test in the previous year.

Development 

From January to April 2006, Cameron worked on the script and developed a culture for the film's aliens, the Na'vi. Their language was created by Dr. Paul Frommer, a linguist at USC. The Na'vi language has a lexicon of about 1000 words, with some 30 added by Cameron. The tongue's phonemes include ejective consonants (such as the "kx" in "skxawng") that are found in Amharic, and the initial "ng" that Cameron may have taken from Te Reo Māori. Actress Sigourney Weaver and the film's set designers met with Jodie S. Holt, professor of plant physiology at University of California, Riverside, to learn about the methods used by botanists to study and sample plants, and to discuss ways to explain the communication between Pandora's organisms depicted in the film.

From 2005 to 2007, Cameron worked with a handful of designers, including famed fantasy illustrator Wayne Barlowe and renowned concept artist Jordu Schell, to shape the design of the Na'vi with paintings and physical sculptures when Cameron felt that 3-D brush renderings were not capturing his vision, often working together in the kitchen of Cameron's Malibu home. The following August, the visual effects studio Weta Digital signed on to help Cameron produce Avatar. Stan Winston, who had collaborated with Cameron in the past, joined Avatar to help with the film's designs. Production design for the film took several years. The film had two different production designers, and two separate art departments, one of which focused on the flora and fauna of Pandora, and another that created human machines and human factors. In , Cameron was announced to be using his own Reality Camera System to film in 3-D. The system would use two high-definition cameras in a single camera body to create depth perception.

While these preparations were underway, Fox kept wavering in its commitment to Avatar because of its painful experience with cost overruns and delays on Cameron's previous picture, Titanic. During the production of Titanic, Cameron rewrote the script to streamline the plot by combining several characters' roles and offered to cut his fee if the film were a commercial disappointment. Cameron installed a traffic light with the amber signal lit outside of co-producer Jon Landau's office to represent the film's uncertain future. In mid-2006, Fox told Cameron "in no uncertain terms that they were passing on this film," so he began shopping it around to other studios and approached Walt Disney Studios, showing his proof of concept to then chairman Dick Cook. However, when Disney attempted to take over, Fox exercised its right of first refusal. In , Fox finally agreed to commit to making Avatar after Ingenious Media agreed to back the film, which reduced Fox's financial exposure to less than half of the film's official $237 million budget. After Fox accepted Avatar, one skeptical Fox executive shook his head and told Cameron and Landau, "I don't know if we're crazier for letting you do this, or if you're crazier for thinking you can do this ..."

In December 2006, Cameron described Avatar as "a futuristic tale set on a planet 200 years hence ... an old-fashioned jungle adventure with an environmental conscience [that] aspires to a mythic level of storytelling". The  press release described the film as "an emotional journey of redemption and revolution" and said the story is of "a wounded former Marine, thrust unwillingly into an effort to settle and exploit an exotic planet rich in biodiversity, who eventually crosses over to lead the indigenous race in a battle for survival". The story would be of an entire world complete with an ecosystem of phantasmagorical plants and creatures, and native people with a rich culture and language.

Estimates put the cost of the film at about $280–310 million to produce and an estimated $150 million for marketing, noting that about $30 million in tax credits would lessen the financial impact on the studio and its financiers. A studio spokesperson said that the budget was "$237 million, with $150 million for promotion, end of story."<ref name="Patten (2009)">{{Cite web |last=Patten |first=Dominic |date=December 3, 2009 |title=Avatar' True Cost – and Consequences |url=https://www.thewrap.com/avatars-true-cost-and-consequences-11206/ |url-status=live |archive-url=https://web.archive.org/web/20150702133635/https://www.thewrap.com/avatars-true-cost-and-consequences-11206/ |archive-date=July 2, 2015 |access-date=April 27, 2022 |website=TheWrap}}</ref>

 Filming 

Cameron described the film as a hybrid with a full live-action shoot in combination with computer-generated characters and live environments. "Ideally at the end of the day the audience has no idea which they're looking at," Cameron said. The director indicated that he had already worked four months on nonprincipal scenes for the film. The live action was shot with a modified version of the proprietary digital 3-D Fusion Camera System, developed by Cameron and Vince Pace. In , Fox had announced that 3-D filming for Avatar would be done at 24 frames per second despite Cameron's strong opinion that a 3-D film requires higher frame rate to make strobing less noticeable. According to Cameron, the film is composed of 60% computer-generated elements and 40% live action, as well as traditional miniatures.

Motion-capture photography lasted 31 days at the Hughes Aircraft stage in Playa Vista in Los Angeles. More than a thousand people worked on the production. In preparation of the filming sequences, all of the actors underwent professional training specific to their characters such as archery, horseback riding, firearm use, and hand-to-hand combat. They received language and dialect training in the Na'vi language created for the film. Before shooting the film, Cameron also sent the cast to the Hawaiian tropical rainforests to get a feel for a rainforest setting before shooting on the soundstage.

During filming, Cameron made use of his virtual camera system, a new way of directing motion-capture filmmaking. The system shows the actors' virtual counterparts in their digital surroundings in real time, allowing the director to adjust and direct scenes just as if shooting live action. According to Cameron, "It's like a big, powerful game engine. If I want to fly through space, or change my perspective, I can. I can turn the whole scene into a living miniature and go through it on a 50 to 1 scale." Using conventional techniques, the complete virtual world cannot be seen until the motion-capture of the actors is complete. Cameron said this process does not diminish the value or importance of acting. On the contrary, because there is no need for repeated camera and lighting setups, costume fittings and make-up touch-ups, scenes do not need to be interrupted repeatedly. Cameron described the system as a "form of pure creation where if you want to move a tree or a mountain or the sky or change the time of day, you have complete control over the elements".

Cameron gave fellow directors Steven Spielberg and Peter Jackson a chance to test the new technology. Spielberg said, "I like to think of it as digital makeup, not augmented animation ... Motion capture brings the director back to a kind of intimacy that actors and directors only know when they're working in live theater." Spielberg and George Lucas were also able to visit the set to watch Cameron direct with the equipment.

To film the shots where CGI interacts with live action, a unique camera referred to as a "simulcam" was used, a merger of the 3-D fusion camera and the virtual camera systems. While filming live action in real time with the simulcam, the CGI images captured with the virtual camera or designed from scratch, are superimposed over the live action images as in augmented reality and shown on a small monitor, making it possible for the director to instruct the actors how to relate to the virtual material in the scene.

Due to Cameron's personal convictions about climate change, he allowed only plant-based (vegan) food to be served on set.

 Visual effects 

A number of innovative visual effects techniques were used during production. According to Cameron, work on the film had been delayed since the 1990s to allow the techniques to reach the necessary degree of advancement to adequately portray his vision of the film.

Innovations include a new system for lighting massive areas like Pandora's jungle, a motion-capture stage or "volume" six times larger than any previously used, and an improved method of capturing facial expressions, enabling full performance capture. To achieve the face capturing, actors wore individually made skull caps fitted with a tiny camera positioned in front of the actors' faces; the information collected about their facial expressions and eyes is then transmitted to computers. According to Cameron, the method allows the filmmakers to transfer 100% of the actors' physical performances to their digital counterparts.
Besides the performance capture data which were transferred directly to the computers, numerous reference cameras gave the digital artists multiple angles of each performance. A technically challenging scene was near the end of the film when the computer-generated Neytiri held the live action Jake in human form, and attention was given to the details of the shadows and reflected light between them.

The lead visual effects company was Weta Digital in Wellington, at one point employing 900 people to work on the film. Because of the huge amount of data which needed to be stored, cataloged and available for everybody involved, even on the other side of the world, a new cloud computing and Digital Asset Management (DAM) system named Gaia was created by Microsoft especially for Avatar, which allowed the crews to keep track of and coordinate all stages in the digital processing. To render Avatar, Weta used a  server farm making use of 4,000 Hewlett-Packard servers with 35,000 processor cores with 104 terabytes of RAM and three petabytes of network area storage running Ubuntu Linux, Grid Engine cluster manager, and 2 of the animation software and managers, Pixar's RenderMan and Pixar's Alfred queue management system. The render farm occupies the 193rd to 197th spots in the TOP500 list of the world's most powerful supercomputers. A new texturing and paint software system, called Mari, was developed by The Foundry in cooperation with Weta. Creating the Na'vi characters and the virtual world of Pandora required over a petabyte of digital storage, and each minute of the final footage for Avatar occupies 17.28 gigabytes of storage. It would often take the computer several hours to render a single frame of the film. To help finish preparing the special effects sequences on time, a number of other companies were brought on board, including Industrial Light & Magic, which worked alongside Weta Digital to create the battle sequences. ILM was responsible for the visual effects for many of the film's specialized vehicles and devised a new way to make CGI explosions. Joe Letteri was the film's visual effects general supervisor.

 Music and soundtrack 

Composer James Horner scored the film, his third collaboration with Cameron after Aliens and Titanic.
He also worked with Wanda Bryant, an ethnomusicologist, to create a music culture for the alien race.
The first scoring sessions were planned to take place in early 2009. During production, Horner promised Cameron that he would not work on any other project except for Avatar and reportedly worked on the score from four in the morning until ten at night throughout the process. He stated in an interview, "Avatar has been the most difficult film I have worked on and the biggest job I have undertaken." Horner composed the score as two different scores merged into one. He first created a score that reflected the Na'vi way of sound and then combined it with a separate "traditional" score to drive the film.
British singer Leona Lewis was chosen to sing the theme song for the film, called "I See You". An accompanying music video, directed by Jake Nava, premiered , 2009, on MySpace.

 Themes and inspirations Avatar is primarily an action-adventure journey of self-discovery, in the context of imperialism, and deep ecology.
Cameron said his inspiration was "every single science fiction book I read as a kid" and that he wanted to update the style of Edgar Rice Burroughs' John Carter series. He acknowledged that Avatar shares themes with the films At Play in the Fields of the Lord, The Emerald Forest, and Princess Mononoke, which feature clashes between cultures and civilizations, and with Dances with Wolves, where a battered soldier finds himself drawn to the culture he was initially fighting against. He also cited Hayao Miyazaki's anime films such as Princess Mononoke as an influence on the ecosystem of Pandora.

In 2012, Cameron filed a 45-page legal declaration that intended to "describe in great detail the
genesis of the ideas, themes, storylines, and images that came to be Avatar." In addition to historical events (such as European colonization of the Americas), his life experiences and several of his unproduced projects, Cameron drew connections between Avatar and his previous films. He cited his script and concept art for Xenogenesis, partially produced as a short film, as being the basis for many of the ideas and visual designs in Avatar. He stated that Avatar "concepts of a world mind, intelligence within nature, the idea of projecting force or consciousness using an avatar, colonization of alien planets, greedy corporate interests backed up by military force, the story of a seemingly weaker group prevailing over a technologically superior force, and the good scientist were all established and recurrent themes" from his earlier films including Aliens, The Abyss, Rambo: First Blood Part II, The Terminator and Terminator 2: Judgment Day. He specifically mentioned the "water tentacle" in The Abyss as an example of an "avatar" that "takes on the appearance of...an alien life form...in order to bridge the cultural gap and build trust."

Cameron also cited a number of works by other creators as "reference points and sources of inspiration" for Avatar. These include two of his "favorite" films, 2001: A Space Odyssey, where mankind experiences an evolution after meeting alien life, and Lawrence of Arabia, where "an outsider...encounters and immerses into a foreign culture and then ultimately joins that group to fight other outsiders." Cameron said he became familiar with the concept of a human operating a "synthetic avatar" inside another world from George Henry Smith's short story "In the Imagicon" and Arthur C. Clarke's novel The City and the Stars. He said he learned of the term "avatar" by reading the cyberpunk novels Neuromancer by William Gibson and Islands in the Net by Bruce Sterling. The idea of a "world mind" originated in the novel Solaris by Stanislaw Lem. Cameron mentioned several other films about people interacting with "indigenous cultures" as inspiring him, including Dances with Wolves, The Man Who Would Be King, The Mission, The Emerald Forest, Medicine Man, The Jungle Book and FernGully. He also cited as inspiration the John Carter and Tarzan stories by Edgar Rice Burroughs and other adventure stories by Rudyard Kipling and H. Rider Haggard.

In a 2007 interview with Time magazine, Cameron was asked about the meaning of the term Avatar, to which he replied, "It's an incarnation of one of the Hindu gods taking a flesh form. In this film what that means is that the human technology in the future is capable of injecting a human's intelligence into a remotely located body, a biological body." Cameron also cited the Japanese cyberpunk manga and anime Ghost in the Shell, in terms of how humans can remotely control, and transfer their personalities into, alien bodies.

The look of the Na'vi – the humanoids indigenous to Pandora – was inspired by a dream that Cameron's mother had, long before he started work on Avatar. In her dream, she saw a blue-skinned woman 12 feet tall, which he thought was "kind of a cool image". Also he said, "I just like blue. It's a good color ... plus, there's a connection to the Hindu deities, which I like conceptually." He included similar creatures in his first screenplay (written in 1976 or 1977), which featured a planet with a native population of "gorgeous" tall blue aliens. The Na'vi were based on them.

For the love story between characters Jake and Neytiri, Cameron applied a star-crossed love theme, which he said was in the tradition of Romeo and Juliet. He acknowledged its similarity to the pairing of Jack and Rose from his film Titanic. An interviewer stated, "Both couples come from radically different cultures that are contemptuous of their relationship and are forced to choose sides between the competing communities." Cameron described Neytiri as his "Pocahontas," saying that his plotline followed the historical story of a "white outsider [who] falls in love with the chief's daughter, who becomes his guide to the tribe and to their special bond with nature." Cameron felt that whether or not the Jake and Neytiri love story would be perceived as believable partially hinged on the physical attractiveness of Neytiri's alien appearance, which was developed by considering her appeal to the all-male crew of artists. Although Cameron felt Jake and Neytiri do not fall in love right away, their portrayers (Worthington and Saldana) felt the characters did. Cameron said the two actors "had a great chemistry" during filming.

For the film's floating "Hallelujah Mountains", the designers drew inspiration from "many different types of mountains, but mainly the karst limestone formations in China." According to production designer Dylan Cole, the fictional floating rocks were inspired by Huangshan (also known as Yellow Mountain), Guilin, Zhangjiajie, among others around the world. Cameron had noted the influence of the Chinese peaks on the design of the floating mountains.

To create the interiors of the human mining colony on Pandora, production designers visited the Noble Clyde Boudreaux oil platform in the Gulf of Mexico during . They photographed, measured and filmed every aspect of the platform, which was later replicated on-screen with photorealistic CGI during post-production.

Cameron said that he wanted to make "something that has this spoonful of sugar of all the action and the adventure and all that" but also have a conscience "that maybe in the enjoying of it makes you think a little bit about the way you interact with nature and your fellow man". He added that "the Na'vi represent something that is our higher selves, or our aspirational selves, what we would like to think we are" and that even though there are good humans within the film, the humans "represent what we know to be the parts of ourselves that are trashing our world and maybe condemning ourselves to a grim future".

Cameron acknowledges that Avatar implicitly criticizes the United States' role in the Iraq War and the impersonal nature of mechanized warfare in general. In reference to the use of the term shock and awe in the film, Cameron said, "We know what it feels like to launch the missiles. We don't know what it feels like for them to land on our home soil, not in America." He said in later interviews, "... I think it's very patriotic to question a system that needs to be corralled ..." and, "The film is definitely not anti-American."
A scene in the film portrays the violent destruction of the towering Na'vi Hometree, which collapses in flames after a missile attack, coating the landscape with ash and floating embers. Asked about the scene's resemblance to the September 11 attacks on the World Trade Center, Cameron said he had been "surprised at how much it did look like ".

 Marketing 

 Promotions 

Twenty-five minutes of footage was screened in Dolby 3D.
Weaver and Cameron appeared at additional panels to promote the film, speaking on the 23rd and 24th respectively. James Cameron announced at the Comic-Con Avatar Panel that  will be 'Avatar Day'. On this day, the trailer was released in all theatrical formats. The official game trailer and toy line of the film were also unveiled on this day.

An extended version in IMAX 3D received overwhelmingly positive reviews. The Hollywood Reporter said that audience expectations were colored by "the [same] establishment skepticism that preceded Titanic" and suggested the showing reflected the desire for original storytelling. The teaser has been among the most viewed trailers in the history of film marketing, reaching the first place of all trailers viewed on Apple.com with 4 million views.
On October 30, to celebrate the opening of the first 3-D cinema in Vietnam, Fox allowed Megastar Cinema to screen exclusive 16 minutes of Avatar to a number of press. It is said to be the largest live motion picture trailer viewing in history.

The Coca-Cola Company collaborated with Fox to launch a worldwide marketing campaign to promote the film. The highlight of the campaign was the website AVTR.com. Specially marked bottles and cans of Coca-Cola Zero, when held in front of a webcam, enabled users to interact with the website's 3-D features using augmented reality (AR) technology. The film was heavily promoted in an episode of the Fox series Bones in the episode "The Gamer In The Grease" (Season 5, Episode 9). Avatar star Joel David Moore has a recurring role on the program, and is seen in the episode anxiously awaiting the release of the film. A week prior to the American release, Zoe Saldana promoted the film on Adult Swim when she was interviewed by an animated Space Ghost. McDonald's had a promotion mentioned in television commercials in Europe called "Avatarize yourself", which encouraged people to go to the website set up by Oddcast, and use a photograph of themselves to change into a Na'vi.

It is presented as a compilation of data collected by the humans about Pandora and the life on it, written by Maria Wilhelm and Dirk Mathison. HarperFestival also released Wilhelm's 48-page James Cameron's Avatar: The Reusable Scrapbook for children. The book features detailed production artwork from the film, including production sketches, illustrations by Lisa Fitzpatrick, and film stills. Producer Jon Landau wrote the foreword, Cameron wrote the epilogue, and director Peter Jackson wrote the preface. In , Abrams Books also released The Making of Avatar, a 272-page book that detailed the film's production process and contains over 500 color photographs and illustrations.

In a 2009 interview, Cameron said that he planned to write a novel version of Avatar after the film was released. In , producer Jon Landau stated that Cameron plans a prequel novel for Avatar that will "lead up to telling the story of the movie, but it would go into much more depth about all the stories that we didn't have time to deal with", saying that "Jim wants to write a novel that is a big, epic story that fills in a lot of things". In August 2013 it was announced that Cameron hired Steven Gould to pen four standalone novels to expand the Avatar universe.

 Video game 

Cameron chose Ubisoft Montreal to create an Avatar game for the film in 2007. The filmmakers and game developers collaborated heavily, and Cameron decided to include some of Ubisoft's vehicle and creature designs in the film. A second game, Avatar: Frontiers of Pandora, was under development as of 2021.

 Action figures and postage stamps 

Mattel Toys announced in December 2009 that it would be introducing a line of Avatar action figures.
Each action figure will be made with a 3-D web tag, called an i-TAG, that consumers can scan using a web cam, revealing unique on-screen content that is exclusive to each specific action figure. A series of toys representing six different characters from the film were also distributed globally in McDonald's Happy Meals.

In December 2009, France Post released a special limited edition stamp based on Avatar, coinciding with the film's worldwide release.

 Releases 

 Theatrical 

Cameron stated that the film's aspect ratio would be 1.78:1 for 3D screenings and that a 2.39:1 image would be extracted for 2D screenings. However, a 3D 2.39:1 extract was approved for use with constant-image-height screens (i.e., screens that increase in width to display 2.39:1 films). The problems were fixed in time for the public premiere.Avatar was released in a total of 3,457 theaters in the US, of which 2,032 theaters showed it in 3D. In total, 90% of all advance ticket sales for Avatar were for 3D screenings.

Internationally, Avatar opened on a total of 14,604 screens in 106 territories, of which 3,671 were showing the film in 3D (producing 56% of the first weekend gross). The IMAX release was the company's widest to date, a total of 261 theaters worldwide. The previous IMAX record opening was Harry Potter and the Half-Blood Prince, which opened in 161 IMAX theaters in the US, and about 70 international. 20th Century Fox Korea adapted and later released Avatar in 4D version, which included "moving seats, smells of explosives, sprinkling water, laser lights and wind".

 Post-original release 

Avatar: Special Edition includes an additional nine minutes of footage, all of which is CG, including an extension of the sex scene and various other scenes that were cut from the original theatrical film. This extended re-release resulted in the film's run time approaching the then-current IMAX platter maximum of 170 minutes, thereby leaving less time for the end credits. Cameron stated that the nine minutes of added scenes cost more than  a minute to produce and finish. During its 12-week re-release, Avatar: Special Edition grossed an additional $10.74 million in North America and $22.46 million overseas for a worldwide total of $33.2 million. The film was later re-released in China in March 2021, allowing it to surpass Avengers: Endgame to become the highest-grossing film of all time.Avatar was re-released in theaters on September 23, 2022, by Walt Disney Studios Motion Pictures for a limited two week engagement, with the film being remastered in 4K high-dynamic range, with select scenes at a high frame rate of 48-frames-per-second. The reissue was prior to the December 2022 premiere of its sequel, Avatar: The Way of Water. Prior to this, Cameron previously teased a re-release of the film back in 2017 when promoting the Dolby Cinema re-release of Titanic, stating that there were plans in the works to remaster the film with Dolby Vision and re-release it in Dolby Cinema.

 Home media  

The US release was not on a Tuesday as is the norm, but was done to coincide with Earth Day. The first DVD and Blu-ray release does not contain any supplemental features other than the theatrical film and the disc menu in favor of and to make space for optimal picture and sound. The release also preserves the film's native 1.78:1 (16:9) format as Cameron felt that was the best format to watch the film. The Blu-ray disc contains DRM (BD+ 5) which some Blu-ray players might not support without a firmware update.Avatar set a first-day launch record in the U.S. for Blu-ray sales at 1.5 million units sold, breaking the record previously held by The Dark Knight (600,000 units sold). First-day DVD and Blu-ray sales combined were over four million units sold. In its first four days of release, sales of Avatar on Blu-ray reached 2.7 million in the United States and Canada – overtaking The Dark Knight to become the best ever selling Blu-ray release in the region. The release later broke the Blu-ray sales record in the UK the following week. In its first three weeks of release, the film sold a total of  DVD and Blu-ray discs combined, a new record for sales in that period. Avatar retained its record as the top-selling Blu-ray in the US market until January 2015, when it was surpassed by Disney's Frozen.

Three different versions of the film are present on the discs: the original theatrical cut (162 minutes), the special edition cut (170 minutes), and a collector's extended cut (178 minutes). The DVD set spreads the film across two discs, while the Blu-ray set presents it on a single disc. The collector's extended cut contains 8 more minutes of footage, thus making it 16 minutes longer than the original theatrical cut. Cameron mentioned, "you can sit down, and in a continuous screening of the film, watch it with the Earth opening". He stated the "Earth opening" is an additional  minutes of scenes that were in the film for much of its production but were ultimately cut before the film's theatrical release. The release also includes an additional 45 minutes of deleted scenes and other extras.

In , Fox stated that the 3D version would be released some time in 2011. It was later revealed that Fox had given Panasonic an exclusive license for the 3D Blu-ray version and only with the purchase of a Panasonic 3DTV. The length of Panasonic's exclusivity period is stated to last until . On , Cameron stated that the standalone 3D Blu-ray would be the final version of the film's home release and that it was "maybe one, two years out". On Christmas Eve 2010, Avatar had its 3D television world premiere on Sky.

On August 13, 2012, Cameron announced on Facebook that Avatar would be released globally on Blu-ray 3D. The Blu-ray 3D version was finally released on October 16, 2012.

Reception
 Critical response  

The site's consensus reads, "It might be more impressive on a technical level than as a piece of storytelling, but Avatar reaffirms James Cameron's singular gift for imaginative, absorbing filmmaking." On Metacritic — which assigns a weighted mean score — the film has a score of 83 out of 100 based on 35 critics, indicating "universal acclaim". Audiences polled by CinemaScore gave the film an average grade of "A" on an A+ to F scale. Every demographic surveyed was reported to give this rating. These polls also indicated that the main draw of the film was its use of 3D.

Roger Ebert of the Chicago Sun-Times called the film "extraordinary" and gave it four stars out of four. "Watching Avatar, I felt sort of the same as when I saw Star Wars in 1977," he said, adding that like Star Wars and The Lord of the Rings: The Fellowship of the Ring, the film "employs a new generation of special effects" and it "is not simply a sensational entertainment, although it is that. It's a technical breakthrough. It has a flat-out Green and anti-war message".
A. O. Scott of At The Movies also compared his viewing of the film to the first time he viewed Star Wars and he said "although the script is a little bit ... obvious," it was "part of what made it work". Todd McCarthy of Variety praised the film, saying "The King of the World sets his sights on creating another world entirely in Avatar, and it's very much a place worth visiting." Kirk Honeycutt of The Hollywood Reporter gave the film a positive review. "The screen is alive with more action and the soundtrack pops with more robust music than any dozen sci-fi shoot-'em-ups you care to mention," he stated. Peter Travers of Rolling Stone awarded Avatar a three-and-a-half out of four star rating and wrote in his print review "It extends the possibilities of what movies can do. Cameron's talent may just be as big as his dreams." Richard Corliss of Time magazine thought that the film was "the most vivid and convincing creation of a fantasy world ever seen in the history of moving pictures." Kenneth Turan of the Los Angeles Times thought the film has "powerful" visual accomplishments but "flat dialogue" and "obvious characterization". James Berardinelli of ReelViews praised the film and its story, giving it four out of four stars; he wrote "In 3-D, it's immersive – but the traditional film elements – story, character, editing, theme, emotional resonance, etc. – are presented with sufficient expertise to make even the 2-D version an engrossing -hour experience."Avatars underlying social and political themes attracted attention. Armond White of the New York Press wrote that Cameron used "villainous American characters" to "misrepresent facets of militarism, capitalism, and imperialism".See also last paragraph of the above section Avatar Themes and inspirations. Russell D. Moore of The Christian Post concluded that "propaganda exists in the film" and stated "If you can get a theater full of people in Kentucky to stand and applaud the defeat of their country in war, then you've got some amazing special effects." Adam Cohen of The New York Times was more positive about the film, calling its anti-imperialist message "a 22nd-century version of the American colonists vs. the British, India vs. the Raj, or Latin America vs. United Fruit". Ross Douthat of The New York Times opined that the film is "Cameron's long apologia for pantheism [...] Hollywood's religion of choice for a generation now", while Saritha Prabhu of The Tennessean called the film a "misportrayal of pantheism and Eastern spirituality in general", and Maxim Osipov of The Hindustan Times, on the contrary, commended the film's message for its overall consistency with the teachings of Hinduism in the Bhagavad Gita. Annalee Newitz of io9 concluded that Avatar is another film that has the recurring "fantasy about race" whereby "some white guy" becomes the "most awesome" member of a non-white culture. Michael Phillips of the Chicago Tribune called Avatar "the season's ideological Rorschach blot", while Miranda Devine of The Sydney Morning Herald thought that "It [was] impossible to watch Avatar without being banged over the head with the director's ideological hammer." Nidesh Lawtoo believed that an essential, yet less visible social theme that contributed to Avatars success concerns contemporary fascinations with virtual avatars and "the transition from the world of reality to that of virtual reality".

Critics and audiences have cited similarities with other films, literature or media, describing the perceived connections in ways ranging from simple "borrowing" to outright plagiarism. Ty Burr of The Boston Globe called it "the same movie" as Dances with Wolves. Like Dances with Wolves, Avatar has been characterized as being a "white savior" movie, in which a "backwards" native people is impotent without the leadership of a member of the invading white culture. Parallels to the concept and use of an avatar are in Poul Anderson's 1957 novelette "Call Me Joe", in which a paralyzed man uses his mind from orbit to control an artificial body on Jupiter. Cinema audiences in Russia have noted that Avatar has elements in common with the 1960s Noon Universe novels by Arkady and Boris Strugatsky, which are set in the 22nd century on a forested world called Pandora with a sentient indigenous species called the Nave. Various reviews have compared Avatar to the films FernGully: The Last Rainforest, Pocahontas and The Last Samurai. NPR's Morning Edition has compared the film to a montage of tropes, with one commentator stating that Avatar was made by "mixing a bunch of film scripts in a blender". Gary Westfahl wrote that "the science fiction story that most closely resembles Avatar has to be Ursula Le Guin's novella The Word for World Is Forest (1972), another epic about a benevolent race of alien beings who happily inhabit dense forests while living in harmony with nature until they are attacked and slaughtered by invading human soldiers who believe that the only good gook is a dead gook". The science fiction writer and editor Gardner Dozois said that along with the Anderson and Le Guin stories, the "mash-up" included Alan Dean Foster's 1975 novel, Midworld. Some sources saw similarities to the artwork of Roger Dean, which features fantastic images of dragons and floating rock formations. In 2013, Dean sued Cameron and Fox, claiming that Pandora was inspired by 14 of his images. Dean sought damages of $50m. Dean's case was dismissed in 2014, and The Hollywood Reporter noted that Cameron had won multiple Avatar idea theft cases.Avatar received compliments from filmmakers, with Steven Spielberg praising it as "the most evocative and amazing science-fiction movie since Star Wars" and others calling it "audacious and awe inspiring", "master class", and "brilliant". Noted art director-turned-filmmaker Roger Christian is also a noted fan of the film. On the other hand, Duncan Jones said: "It's not in my top three James Cameron films. ... [A]t what point in the film did you have any doubt what was going to happen next?". For French filmmaker Luc Besson, Avatar opened the doors for him to now create an adaptation of the graphic novel series Valérian and Laureline that technologically supports the scope of its source material, with Besson even throwing his original script in the trash and redoing it after seeing the film. TIME ranked Avatar number 3 in their list of "The 10 Greatest Movies of the Millennium (Thus Far)" also earning it a spot on the magazine's All-Time 100 list, and IGN listed Avatar as number 22 on their list of the top 25 Sci-Fi movies of all time.

 Box office 

 General Avatar was released internationally on more than 14,000 screens. It grossed $3,537,000 from midnight screenings in the United States and Canada, with the initial 3D release limited to 2,200 screens. The film grossed $26,752,099 on its opening day, and $77,025,481 over its opening weekend, making it the second-largest December opening ever behind I Am Legend, the largest domestic opening weekend for a film not based on a franchise (topping The Incredibles), the highest opening weekend for a film entirely in 3D (breaking Ups record), the highest opening weekend for an environmentalist film (breaking The Day After Tomorrows record), and the 40th-largest opening weekend in North America, despite a blizzard that blanketed the East Coast of the United States and reportedly hurt its opening weekend results. The film also set an IMAX opening weekend record, with 178 theaters generating approximately $9.5 million, 12% of the film's $77 million (at the time) North American gross on less than 3% of the screens.

International markets generating opening weekend tallies of at least $10 million were for Russia ($19.7 million), France ($17.4 million), the UK ($13.8 million), Germany ($13.3 million), South Korea ($11.7 million), Australia ($11.5 million), and Spain ($11.0 million). Avatars worldwide gross was US$241.6 million after five days, the ninth largest opening-weekend gross of all time, and the largest for a non-franchise, non-sequel and original film. 58 international IMAX screens generated an estimated $4.1 million during the opening weekend.

Revenues in the film's second weekend decreased by only 1.8% in domestic markets, marking a rare occurrence, grossing $75,617,183, to remain in first place at the box office and recording what was then the biggest second weekend of all time. The film experienced another marginal decrease in revenue in its third weekend, dropping 9.4% to $68,490,688 domestically, remaining in first place at the box office, to set a third-weekend record.Avatar crossed the $1 billion mark on the 19th day of its international release, making it the first film to reach this mark in only 19 days. It became the fifth film grossing more than $1 billion worldwide, and the only film of 2009 to do so. In its fourth weekend, Avatar continued to lead the box office domestically, setting a new all-time fourth-weekend record of $50,306,217, and becoming the highest-grossing 2009 release in the United States. In the film's fifth weekend, it set the Martin Luther King Day weekend record, grossing $54,401,446, and set a fifth-weekend record with a take of $42,785,612. It held the top spot to set the sixth and seventh weekend records grossing $34,944,081 and $31,280,029 respectively. It was the fastest film to gross $600 million domestically, on its 47th day in theaters.

It remained at number one at the domestic box office for seven consecutive weeks – the most consecutive No. 1 weekends since Titanic spent 15 weekends at No.1 in 1997 and 1998 – and also spent 11 consecutive weekends at the top of the box office outside the United States and Canada, breaking the record of nine consecutive weekends set by Pirates of the Caribbean: Dead Man's Chest. By the end of its first theatrical release Avatar had grossed $749,766,139 in the U.S. and Canada, and $ in other territories, for a worldwide total of $.

Including the revenue from a re-release of Avatar featuring extended footage, Avatar grossed $785,221,649 in the U.S. and Canada, and $2,137,696,265 in other countries for a worldwide total of $2,922,917,914. On , 47 days after its domestic release, Avatar surpassed Titanic to become the highest-grossing film of all time in Canada and the United States. It became the highest-grossing film of all time in at least 30 other countries and is the first film to gross over $2 billion in foreign box office receipts.
IMAX ticket sales account for $243.3 million of its worldwide gross, more than double the previous record. By 2022, this figure rose to $268.6 million.

Box Office Mojo estimates that after adjusting for the rise in average ticket prices, Avatar would be the 14th-highest-grossing film of all time in North America. On a worldwide basis, when Avatars gross stood at $2 billion just 35 days into its run, The Daily Telegraph estimated its gross was surpassed by only Gone with the Wind ($3.0 billion), Titanic ($2.9 billion), and Star Wars ($2.2 billion) after adjusting for inflation to 2010 prices, with Avatar ultimately winding up with $2.92 billion after subsequent re-releases. Reuters even placed it ahead of Titanic after adjusting the global total for inflation. The 2015 edition of Guinness World Records lists Avatar only behind Gone with the Wind in terms of adjusted grosses worldwide.

 Commercial analysis 

Before its release, various film critics and fan communities predicted the film would be a significant disappointment at the box office, in line with predictions made for Cameron's previous blockbuster Titanic. This criticism ranged from Avatars film budget, to its concept and use of 3-D "blue cat people". Slate magazine's Daniel Engber complimented the 3D effects but criticized them for reminding him of certain CGI characters from the Star Wars prequel films and for having the "uncanny valley" effect. The New York Times noted that 20th Century Fox executives had decided to release Alvin and the Chipmunks: The Squeakquel alongside Avatar, calling it a "secret weapon" to cover any unforeseeable losses at the box office.

Box office analysts, on the other hand, estimated that the film would be a box office success. "The holy grail of 3-D has finally arrived," said an analyst for Exhibitor Relations. "This is why all these 3-D venues were built: for Avatar. This is the one. The behemoth." The "cautionary estimate" was that Avatar would bring in around $60 million in its opening weekend. Others guessed higher. There were also analysts who believed that the film's three-dimensionality would help its box office performance, given that recent 3D films had been successful.

Cameron said he felt the pressure of the predictions, but that pressure is good for film-makers. "It makes us think about our audiences and what the audience wants," he stated. "We owe them a good time. We owe them a piece of good entertainment." Although he felt Avatar would appeal to everyone and that the film could not afford to have a target demographic, he especially wanted hard-core science-fiction fans to see it: "If I can just get 'em in the damn theater, the film will act on them in the way it's supposed to, in terms of taking them on an amazing journey and giving them this rich emotional experience." Cameron was aware of the sentiment that Avatar would need significant "repeat business" just to make up for its budget and achieve box office success, and believed Avatar could inspire the same "sharing" reaction as Titanic. He said that film worked because, "When people have an experience that's very powerful in the movie theatre, they want to go share it. They want to grab their friend and bring them, so that they can enjoy it. They want to be the person to bring them the news that this is something worth having in their life."

After the film's release and unusually strong box office performance over its first two weeks, it was debated as the one film capable of surpassing Titanics worldwide gross, and its continued strength perplexed box office analysts. Other films in recent years had been cited as contenders for surpassing Titanic, such as 2008's The Dark Knight, but Avatar was considered the first film with a genuine chance to do so, and its numbers being aided by higher ticket prices for 3D screenings did not fully explain its success to box office analysts. "Most films are considered to be healthy if they manage anything less than a 50% drop from their first weekend to their second. Dipping just 11% from the first to the third is unheard of," said Paul Dergarabedian, president of box-office analysis for Hollywood.com. "This is just unprecedented. I had to do a double take. I thought it was a miscalculation." Analysts predicted second place for the film's worldwide gross, but most were uncertain about it surpassing Titanic because "Today's films flame out much faster than they did when Titanic was released." Brandon Gray, president of Box Office Mojo, believed in the film's chances of becoming the highest-grossing film of all time, though he also believed it was too early to surmise because it had only played during the holidays. He said, "While Avatar may beat Titanics record, it will be tough, and the film is unlikely to surpass Titanic in attendance. Ticket prices were about $3 cheaper in the late 1990s." Cameron said he did not think it was realistic to "try to topple Titanic off its perch" because it "just struck some kind of chord" and there had been other good films in recent years. He changed his prediction by mid-January. "It's gonna happen. It's just a matter of time," he said.

Although analysts have been unable to agree that Avatars success is attributable to one primary factor, several explanations have been advanced. First, January is historically "the dumping ground for the year's weakest films", and this also applied to 2010.
Cameron himself said he decided to open the film in December so that it would have less competition from then to January. Titanic capitalized on the same January predictability, and earned most of its gross in 1998. Additionally, Avatar established itself as a "must-see" event. Gray said, "At this point, people who are going to see Avatar are going to see Avatar and would even if the slate was strong." Marketing the film as a "novelty factor" also helped. Fox positioned the film as a cinematic event that should be seen in the theaters. "It's really hard to sell the idea that you can have the same experience at home," stated David Mumpower, an analyst at BoxOfficeProphets.com. The "Oscar buzz" surrounding the film and international viewings helped. "Two-thirds of Titanics haul was earned overseas, and Avatar [tracked] similarly ...Avatar opened in 106 markets globally and was No. 1 in all of them", and the markets "such as Russia, where Titanic saw modest receipts in 1997 and 1998, are white-hot today" with "more screens and moviegoers" than before.

According to Variety, films in 3D accumulated $1.3 billion in 2009, "a threefold increase over 2008 and more than 10% of the total 2009 box-office gross". The increased ticket price – an average of $2 to $3 per ticket in most markets – helped the film. Likewise, Entertainment Weekly attributed the film's success to 3D glasses but also to its "astronomic word-of-mouth". Not only do some theaters charge up to $18.50 for IMAX tickets, but "the buzz" created by the new technology was the possible cause for sold-out screenings. Gray said Avatar having no basis in previously established material makes its performance remarkable and even more impressive. "The movie might be derivative of many movies in its story and themes," he said, "but it had no direct antecedent like the other top-grossing films: Titanic (historical events), the Star Wars movies (an established film franchise), or The Lord of the Rings (literature). It was a tougher sell ..." The Hollywood Reporter estimated that after a combined production and promotion cost of between $387–437 million, the film turned a net profit of $1.2 billion.

 Accolades Avatar won the 82nd Academy Awards for Best Art Direction, Best Cinematography, and Best Visual Effects, and was nominated for a total of nine, including Best Picture and Best Director. Avatar also won the 67th Golden Globe Awards for Best Motion Picture – Drama and Best Director, and was nominated for two others. At the 36th Saturn Awards, Avatar won all ten awards it was nominated for: Best Science Fiction Film, Best Actor, Best Actress, Best Supporting Actor, Best Supporting Actress, Best Director, Best Writing, Best Music, Best Production Design and Best Special Effects.

The New York Film Critics Online honored the film with its Best Picture award. The film also won the Critics' Choice Awards of the Broadcast Film Critics Association for Best Action Film and several technical categories, out of nine nominations. It won two of the St. Louis Film Critics awards: Best Visual Effects and Most Original, Innovative or Creative Film. The film also won the British Academy of Film and Television Arts (BAFTA) award for Production Design and Special Visual Effects, and was nominated for six others, including Best Film and Director. The film has received numerous other major awards, nominations and honors.

 Legacy 

Despite the film's financial and critical success, some journalists have questioned Avatar's cultural impact. In 2014, Scott Mendelson of Forbes said the film had been "all but forgotten", citing the lack of merchandising, a fandom for the film, or any long-enduring media franchise, and further stated that he believed most general audiences could not remember any of the film's details, such as the names of its characters or actors in the cast. Mendelson argued Avatar's only achievement of note to be its popularization of 3D cinema. Despite this, he still felt it was a quality film, saying, "A great blockbuster movie can just be a great blockbuster movie without capturing the lunchbox market." He further reflected and reversed his stance in 2022 after the box office success of the re-release, saying, "The very things that made Avatar sometimes feel like a 'forgotten blockbuster' have inspired a skewed renewed nostalgia for its singular existence. It was just a movie, an original auteur-specific movie that prioritized top-shelf filmmaking and clockwork plotting over quotable dialogue and memes."

Some have questioned if there is an audience for the film's planned sequels, believing there to be a lack of interest in the face of the multiple delays of their release dates. Writing for The Escapist, Darren Mooney acknowledged that the film had not been broadly remembered in the pop cultural subconscious and had not found a fandom in the same sense as many other popular media, but argued that this was not a negative point, saying, "its defining legacy is the insistence that it lacks a legacy."

In 2022, in response to the trailer for Avatar's upcoming sequel and the film's re-release, journalists again questioned the cultural relevance of the film, particularly Patrick Ryan of USA Today, who said the film had "curiously left almost no pop-culture footprint". In contrast, Bilge Ebiri of Vulture called others' opinions that the film had left no cultural impact "narrow-minded" and said that the film still held up well. A detailed overview of the Avatar franchise was reported in The New York Times in December of that year.

 Sequels 

Two sequels to Avatar were confirmed after the success of the first film; this number was subsequently expanded to four. Their respective release dates were set as December 17, 2021, December 22, 2023, December 19, 2025, and December 17, 2027. Due to the COVID-19 pandemic, the four sequels' releases were delayed a year to December 16, 2022, December 20, 2024, December 18, 2026, and December 22, 2028. Cameron is directing, producing and co-writing all four; Josh Friedman, Rick Jaffa, Amanda Silver, and Shane Salerno all took a part in the writing process of all of the sequels before being assigned to finish the separate scripts, making the eventual writing credits for each film unclear.

Filming for the first two sequels began in September 2017. Sam Worthington, Zoe Saldana, Giovanni Ribisi, Joel David Moore, Dileep Rao, and CCH Pounder are all reprising their roles, as are Stephen Lang and Matt Gerald, despite the deaths of their characters in the first film. Sigourney Weaver is also returning, but as a new character, which was revealed to be Kiri, Jake and Neytiri's adoptive teenage daughter.

New cast members include Cliff Curtis and Kate Winslet as members of the Na'vi reef people of Metkayina and Oona Chaplin as Varang, a "strong and vibrant central character who spans the entire saga of the sequels". Seven child actors will also portray pivotal new characters through the sequels: Jamie Flatters, Britain Dalton, and Trinity Bliss as Jake and Neytiri's children, Bailey Bass, Filip Geljo, and Duane Evans Jr. as free-divers of the Metkayina, and Jack Champion as a Javier "Spider" Socorro, a teenage human adopted by Jake and Neytiri. Although the first two sequels have been greenlit, Cameron stated in an interview on November 26, 2017, "Let's face it, if Avatar 2 and 3 don't make enough money, there's not going to be a 4 and 5".

On November 14, 2018, Cameron announced filming on Avatar: The Way of Water and Avatar 3 with the principal performance capture cast had been completed. In September 2020, Cameron confirmed that live action filming had been completed for 2 and was over 90% complete for 3.

 Related media 

 Stage adaptation Toruk – The First Flight is an original stage production by the Montreal-based Cirque du Soleil which ran between December 2015 and June 2019. Inspired by Avatar, the story is set in Pandora's past, involving a prophecy concerning a threat to the Tree of Souls and a quest for totems from different tribes. Audience members could download an app in order to participate in show effects. On January 18, 2016, it was announced via the Toruk Facebook page that filming for a DVD release had been completed and was undergoing editing.

 Theme park attraction 

In 2011, Cameron, Lightstorm, and Fox entered an exclusive licensing agreement with the Walt Disney Company to feature Avatar-themed attractions at Walt Disney Parks and Resorts worldwide, including a themed land for Disney's Animal Kingdom in Lake Buena Vista, Florida. The area, known as Pandora – The World of Avatar, opened on May 27, 2017.

 Novels 

Following the release of Avatar, Cameron planned to write a novel based on the film, "telling the story of the movie, but [going] into much more depth about all the stories that we didn't have time to deal with." In 2013, this plan was superseded by the announcement of four novels set within the "Avatar expanded universe", to be written by Steven Gould. The books were due to be published by Penguin Random House, although since 2017, there has been no update on the planned book series.

 See also 

 List of films featuring extraterrestrials
 List of films featuring powered exoskeletons
 Run of the Arrow Red Scorpion''

Notes

References

Further reading 

  A detailed analysis of the film's parallels with the teachings of the Vedas.

External links 

 
 Official shooting script
 

 
2000s action adventure films
2000s American films
2000s English-language films
2009 science fiction action films
2009 3D films
2009 films
20th Century Fox films
American 3D films
American action adventure films
American epic films
American science fiction action films
American science fiction adventure films
American space adventure films
BAFTA winners (films)
Best Drama Picture Golden Globe winners
Dune Entertainment films
Environmental films
Fiction set in the 2140s
Fiction set in the 2150s
Fictional-language films
Films about cloning
Films about consciousness transfer
Films about extraterrestrial life
Films about paraplegics or quadriplegics
Films about rebellions
Films about technology
Films about telepresence
Films directed by James Cameron
Films produced by James Cameron
Films produced by Jon Landau
Films scored by James Horner
Films set in forests
Films set in the 22nd century
Films set on fictional moons
Films shot in Hawaii
Films shot in Los Angeles
Films shot in New Zealand
Films that won the Best Visual Effects Academy Award
Films using motion capture
Films whose art director won the Best Art Direction Academy Award
Films whose cinematographer won the Best Cinematography Academy Award
Films whose director won the Best Director Golden Globe
Films with screenplays by James Cameron
Golden Eagle Award (Russia) for Best Foreign Language Film winners
Holography in films
IMAX films
Lightstorm Entertainment films
Military science fiction films
Planetary romances
Rotoscoped films
Science fiction war films
Social science fiction films
Transhumanism in film
Works subject to a lawsuit
Avatar (franchise) films